Finnie is a surname of Scottish origin which means "sincere." Notable people with the surname include:

Dave Finnie, Canadian ice hockey goaltender
Ethel Finnie (1898–1981), American classic female blues singer
John Finnie, Scottish politician
Linda Finnie, (born 1952), a Scottish mezzo-soprano
Roger Finnie, (born 1945), an American football offensive tackle
Ross Finnie, (born 1947), Scottish politician
William Finnie (mayor), 18th-century mayor of Williamsburg, Virginia
William Finnie (MP), (1828–1899), Scottish liberal politician and member of parliament

See also
Feeney, a surname
Finney, a surname
Phinney, a surname

References

Surnames of Scottish origin